Lygophis is a genus of snakes in the subfamily Dipsadinae of the family Colubridae. The genus is endemic to Panama and South America.

Species
The genus Lygophis contains the following eight species which are recognized as being valid.
Lygophis anomalus 
Lygophis dilepis  - Lema's ground snake, Lema’s striped snake
Lygophis elegantissimus 
Lygophis flavifrenatus  - fronted ground snake
Lygophis lineatus  - lined ground snake
Lygophis meridionalis 
Lygophis paucidens  - Hoge's ground snake
Lygophis vanzolinii  - Vanzolini's ground snake

Nota bene: A binomial authority in parentheses indicates that the species was originally described in a genus other than Lygophis.

References

Further reading
Fitzinger L (1843). Systema Reptilium, Fasciculus Primus, Amblyglossae. Vienna: Braumüller & Seidel. 106 pp. + indices. (Lygophis, new genus, p. 26). (in Latin).
Freiberg M (1982). Snakes of South America. Hong Kong: T.F.H. Publications. 189 pp. . (Genus Lygophis, p. 103).
Zaher H, Grazziotin PG, Cadle JE, Murphy RW, Moura-Leite JC, Bonatto SL (2009). "Molecular phylogeny of advanced snakes (Serpentes, Caenophidia) with an emphasis on South American Xenodontines: a revised classification and descriptions of new taxa". Papéis Avulsos de Zoologia, Museu de Zoologia da Universidade de São Paulo 49 (11): 115–153. ("Lygophis Fitzinger, 1843 resurrected", p. 147). (in English, with abstracts in English and Portuguese).
https://serpientesdevenezuela.org/lygophis-lineatus/

Lygophis
Snake genera
Taxa named by Leopold Fitzinger